Kukurečani is a village in the Bitola Municipality of North Macedonia. It is situated along the main road between Bitola and Demir Hisar (continuing for Kičevo). It used to be a municipality of its own and its FIPS code was MK56.

Demographics
According to the 1467-68 Ottoman defter, the village had 150 houses, 8 bachelors and 3 widows. The village predominantly displayed Slavic anthroponymy, with a small minority of instances of heads of families having traditional Albanian names, usually alongside a Slavic one.

According to the 2002 census, the village had a total of 966 inhabitants. Ethnic groups in the village include:

Macedonians 950
Serbs 2
Romani 14

References

Villages in Bitola Municipality